The Direct Vision Standard is a measure of how much HGV drivers can see from their cab directly (without the use of mirrors or video cameras). Starting 1 March 2021, Transport for London has required all HGVs over 12 tonnes entering London to have at least a one-star rating. Beginning in October 2024, they will need at least a three-star rating. To meet the one-star standard, a driver will need to be able to see someone's head and shoulders from within an acceptable distance. For the one-star rating, that corresponds to 4.5m at the side and 2m in front. The scheme will be enforced 24/7 and permits will be issued free of charge. Fines of £550 will be issued to any vehicle entering London without a permit, with drivers fined £130.

Impact
TfL said in June 2022 that nearly 200,000 DVS permits had been issued, with 94% of HGVs operating with a safety permit. The number of serious injuries involving HGVs fell from 48 in 2017 to 17 in 2021.

Reaction
Some haulage companies complained that the new standard placed a burden on their companies because they would have to contact the manufacturer to find out their safety rating. However, TfL's head of delivery planning, Christina Calderato, said "The disproportionately high number of HGVs involved in fatal collisions with pedestrians and cyclists is a tragedy. This is why we’ve worked closely with the freight and logistics industry and vulnerable road user groups to develop the Direct Vision Standard and HGV Safety Standard Permit Scheme. Together we hope that these new safety measures will help to save many lives in the future."

References

 
Driving in the United Kingdom